Where Grass Won't Grow is an album by American country music artist George Jones released in 1969 (see 1969 in country music) on the Musicor Records label.

Background 
Where Grass Won't Grow came towards the end of Jones's association with Musicor.  Jones dissatisfaction with the production on his own records and his new marriage to Tammy Wynette only increased his desire to leave Musicor and join her at Epic Records.  Significant cuts on the album include "She's Mine" and "If Not For You", which both reached number six on the charts, and "Where Grass Won't Grow", a song Jones would revisit as a duet with Dolly Parton, Emmylou Harris and Trisha Yearwood as part of The Bradley Barn Sessions in 1994.  The album would only reach number 15 on the country albums chart.  Writing for AllMusic, Eugene Chadbourne criticizes the album for being lackluster, calling it "needlessly bland and the inevitable result of trying to tame the wild stallion" and laments that "the star seems to be receiving songs from only a handful of sources here, none of which do him much justice."

Track listing 
 "Where Grass Won't Grow" (Earl Montgomery) – 3:12
 "For Better or for Worse" (Eddie Miller, Eddie Noack) – 2:18
 "If Not for You" (Jerry Chesnut) – 2:58
 "Until I Remember You're Gone" (Dallas Frazier) – 2:24
 "Barbara Joy" (Noack) – 2:18
 "No Blues Is Good News" (Noack) – 2:26
 "Same Old Boat" (James Wallace/Benny Barnes) – 2:09
 "Old Blue Tomorrow" (Darrell Edwards) – 2:15
 "Shoulder to Shoulder" (Frazier) – 2:20
 "She's Mine" (George Jones, Jack Ripley) – 2:55

Charts

Weekly charts

Year-end charts

References

External links 
 George Jones' Official Website

1969 albums
George Jones albums
Musicor Records albums